Birchwood Lakes may refer to:

Birchwood Lakes, New Jersey
Birchwood Lakes, Pennsylvania